The GN convoys were a series of Caribbean convoys which ran during the Battle of the Atlantic in World War II.

They take their name from the route: Guantanamo, Cuba to New York City

Overview 
The GN series was the reverse of NG series that ran from August 1942 until 18 May 1945. There were 207 GN convoys, comprising 4,313 individual ship listings and 18 escorts. Some of the ships listed in a convoy did not always make the complete trip between Guantanamo and New York though, a few returned to Guantanamo, stopped at Charleston, South Carolina, or other ports.

Convoy List

1942

1943 

1944

1945

Notes 
Citations

Bibliography 

Books
 
 
 
Online resources

External links 
 Full listing of ships sailing in GN convoys

GN 0
Battle of the Atlantic
Caribbean Sea operations of World War II